Monument Beach is a census-designated place (CDP) in the town of Bourne in Barnstable County, Massachusetts, United States. The population was 2,790 at the 2010 census.

Geography
Monument Beach is located near the center of the town of Bourne. It is situated between Buzzards Bay to the west and Massachusetts Route 28 to the east. The village of Bourne is to the north, and Pocasset village is to the south.

Beach
Monument Beach is also the name of a beach in the Monument Beach CDP on Phinneys Harbor. The beach is used by windsurfers and has lifeguards. It is adjacent to the Monument Beach Marina. It has restrooms and is operated by the town of Bourne.

Demographics

As of the census of 2000, there were 2,438 people, 1,023 households, and 694 families residing in the CDP. The population density was 926.7/mi2 (357.9/km2). There were 1,213 housing units at an average density of 461.1/mi2 (178.1/km2) . The racial makeup of the CDP was 96.47% White, 0.86% African American, 0.12% Native American, 0.66% Asian, 0.74% from other races, and 1.15% from two or more races. Hispanic or Latino of any race were 0.94% of the population.

There were 1,023 households, out of which 26.4% had children under the age of 18 living with them, 54.8% were married couples living together, 9.4% had a female householder with no husband present, and 32.1% were non-families. 25.6% of all households were made up of individuals, and 9.7% had someone living alone who was 65 years of age or older. The average household size was 2.38 and the average family size was 2.88.

In the CDP, the population was spread out, with 21.9% under the age of 18, 5.6% from 18 to 24, 28.2% from 25 to 44, 27.6% from 45 to 64, and 16.7% who were 65 years of age or older. The median age was 42 years. For every 100 females, there were 92.6 males. For every 100 females age 18 and over, there were 90.0 males.

The median income for a household in the CDP was $148,564, and the median income for a family was $191,774. Males had a median income of $98,433 versus $80,650 for females. The per capita income for the CDP was $103,231. About .1% of families and .4% of the population were below the poverty line, including .08% of those under age 18 and .09% of those age 65 or over.

See also
Back River (Buzzards Bay)
Pocasset River (Massachusetts)

References

Bourne, Massachusetts
Census-designated places in Barnstable County, Massachusetts
Census-designated places in Massachusetts
Populated coastal places in Massachusetts